Strege may refer to:

Stege, Denmark, a town on the island of Møn in south-eastern Denmark
Stege Church
Stege, California, a former town in western Contra Costa County, California
Stege Creek, an alternate name for Baxter Creek, used especially in the Booker T. Washington Park and Stege Marsh areas
Stege Marsh, a wetlands area in Richmond, California
Stege and Waidbach, two small rivers in Mecklenburg-Vorpommern, Germany
People with the surname, Stege, include:

 Richard Stege, founder of Stege, California
 Tina Stege, climate envoy for the Marshall Islands